The simple station Consuelo is part of the TransMilenio mass-transit system of Bogotá, Colombia, opened in the year 2000.

Location
The station is located in southern Bogotá, specifically on Avenida Caracas with Carreras 11A and 12.

It serves the El Consuelo and Tunjelito Centro neighborhoods.

History
At the beginning of 2001, the second phase of the Caracas line of the system was opened from Tercer Milenio to the intermediate station Calle 40 Sur. A few months later, service was extended south to Portal de Usme.

The station is named Consuelo for the neighborhood located on its west side.

Station Services

Old trunk services

Current Trunk Services

Dual Service

Feeder routes
This station does not have connections to feeder routes.

Inter-city service
This station does not have inter-city service.

See also
Bogotá
TransMilenio
List of TransMilenio Stations

TransMilenio
2001 establishments in Colombia